Ramboda Falls is  high and the eleventh tallest waterfall in Sri Lanka and the 729th tallest waterfall in the world. It is situated in Pussellawa area, on the A5 highway at Ramboda Pass. The waterfall is formed by the Panna Oya which is a tributary of Kothmale Oya.

See also
 List of waterfalls in Sri Lanka

Citations

Notes

References

External links 

Landforms of Nuwara Eliya District
Waterfalls in Central Province, Sri Lanka